Marvel Adventures Spider-Man (preceded by Marvel Age Spider-Man) is a Marvel Comics comic book series intended for all ages, especially children, that ran for 61 issues from May 2005 through May 2010. The Marvel Age Spider-Man stories were based on early issues that Stan Lee wrote in the 1960s. The first few issues of Marvel Adventures Spider-Man carried on this tradition before switching to original, single-issue stories. In June 2010, the series was relaunched as Spider-Man: Marvel Adventures.

Marvel Age Spider-Man
 "Duel to the Death with the Vulture" / "The Uncanny Threat of the Terrible Tinkerer" (re-telling of The Amazing Spider-Man #2)
 "Spider-Man vs. Doctor Octopus" (re-telling of The Amazing Spider-Man #3)
 "Nothing Can Stop the Sandman!" (re-telling of The Amazing Spider-Man #4)
 "Marked for Destruction by Doctor Doom!" (re-telling of The Amazing Spider-Man #5)
 "Face-to-Face with the Lizard!" (re-telling of The Amazing Spider-Man #6)
 "The Return of the Vulture" (re-telling of The Amazing Spider-Man #7)
 "The Terrible Threat of the Living Brain!" / "Spider-Man Tackles the Torch!" (re-telling of The Amazing Spider-Man #8)
 "The Man Called Electro!" (re-telling of The Amazing Spider-Man #9)
 "The Enforcers!" (re-telling of The Amazing Spider-Man #10)
 "The Return of Doctor Octopus!" (re-telling of The Amazing Spider-Man #11)
 "Unmasked by Doctor Octopus!" (re-telling of The Amazing Spider-Man #12)
 "The Menace of Mysterio" (re-telling of The Amazing Spider-Man #13)
 "The Grotesque Adventure of the Green Goblin!" (re-telling of The Amazing Spider-Man #14)
 "Kraven the Hunter" (re-telling of The Amazing Spider-Man #15)
 "Duel with Daredevil!" (re-telling of The Amazing Spider-Man #16)
 "Return of the Green Goblin" (re-telling of The Amazing Spider-Man #17)
 "The End of Spider-Man!" (re-telling of The Amazing Spider-Man #18)
 "Spidey Strikes Back!" (re-telling of The Amazing Spider-Man #19)
 "The Coming of the Scorpion!" (re-telling of The Amazing Spider-Man #20)
 "Where Flies the Beetle!" (re-telling of The Amazing Spider-Man #21)

Marvel Adventures Spider-Man
 "Here Comes Spider-Man" (re-telling of Amazing Fantasy #15) – The story starts out as an introduction of Peter Parker. The story flashes to a school assembly in which a group of scientists explain radiation rays with experimentation on a spider. The radiated spider jumps onto Peter and bites his hand, causing him to gain powers. The rest of the story is about Peter becoming cocky and blaming himself for his uncle's death.
 "The Sinister Six Part 1" (re-telling of The Amazing Spider-Man Annual #1, part 1) – Doctor Octopus, Electro, Mysterio, Kraven the Hunter, the Vulture and the Sandman team up to become the Sinister Six, while Peter suddenly loses his powers.
 "The Sinister Six Part 2" (re-telling of The Amazing Spider-Man Annual #1, part 2) – Spider-Man's powers return, and he goes off to fight the Sinister Six and save Aunt May and J. Jonah Jameson.
 "Goom Got Game" – The Human Torch reluctantly teams up with Spider-Man to fight a concrete creature named Street and a large, hip-hop speaking alien named Goom.
 "Power Struggle"
 "Picture-Perfect Peril!"
 "Vulture Hunt!"
 "Rush Hour!"
 "Doom with a View!"
 "Make Mine Mysterio!"
 "They Call Him Mad!"
 "Nightmare on Spidey Street!"
 "The Chameleon Caper!!"
 "The Black Cat?!"
 "How Spider-Man Stopped Worrying and Learned to Love the Arms!"
 "I, Reptile!"
 "Hair of the Dog That Bit, Ya"
 "Untitled"
 "Untitled" - Spider-Man faces Fin Fang Foom.
 "Monster Mash"
 "Fashion Victims!"
 "World War G"
 "Dust-Up in Aisle Seven"
 "Breaking Up Is Venomous to Do"
 "Three Rings... of Danger"
 "Reading, Writing and a Robot"
 "But Seriously, Folks"
 "I Hate Spider-Man"
 "Rock and Roll"
 "Whirlwind Trout"
 "Fired"
 "Submerged"
 "The Tenant"
 "The Unnatural"
 "The Side-Kick" – Venom wants to do good. In the end, it turns out he only wanted revenge.
 "The Good Son" – Harry tries to free his father Norman from prison. But after finally figuring out that what he is doing is wrong, he helps Spider-Man.
 "School of Hard Knocks" – Peter attends a self-defense class, but the instructor is revealed to only want to sell off students as villains.
 "There's No Bee in Team" – Spider-Man fights a villain named Swarm.
 "Model Student" – Peter volunteers to show a new kid from Latveria. Suddenly the Fantastic Four attacks Peter and his newfound friend. Could this be the work of Dr. Doom?
 "If I Had a Hammer..." – An evil goddess controls Spider-Man, helping her take over Asgard. Can Thor help Spider-Man break free?
 "The Need for Speed Stampede"
 "Cat Fight"
 "A Whale of a Tale"
 "Evil on a Grander Scale" – Spider-Man discovers that Curt Connors is not the only Lizard in town. But who is the one pulling his strings?
 "Pieces of the Puzzle"
 "Silent Nights" – Peter struggles to find Aunt May an expensive Christmas gift. Guest starring the Chameleon.
 "Everything You Read" – Spider-Man finds the Prowler, another misunderstood hero, searching for a giant dragon that stole his inventions.
 "Two for One" – Spider-Man is being attacked constantly by Electro and the Scorpion.
 "Playing Hero" – Spider-Man must fight a robot called the Ultimate Gamer Arcade.
 "Sinister Sixteenth" – It is Peter's birthday and it seems like nobody cares. Meanwhile, the Green Goblin, Doctor Octopus, Hydro-man, the Scorpion, the Rhino, and Electro team up and become the new Sinister Six.
 "PVP (Pete vs. Pete)" – A scientist becomes Paste Pot Pete, who has the ability to shoot glue, and it seems New York has a sticky situation on its hands.
 "No Substitute" – Spider-Man must team up with Spider-Woman to take down a group of spies.
 "A Sense of Responsibility" – Emma Frost and her friend Sophia "Chat" Sanduval discover high school student Peter Parker's unusual secret.
 "Taken for a Ride" – While Peter goes on a "date" with a girl at school, he must deal with a carjacker and a car stealing ring.
 "Why I Was Late for Class" – Captain George Stacy pressures New York’s underworld by using his daughter Gwen as a pawn and Spider-Man teams up with the NYPD to stop the enforcer known as Tombstone, teaming up with Captain America in the process.
 "Vigilantes"
 "The Silencer"
 "Ladies! Ladies! Wait Your Turn!"
 "Bring It"
 "I've Got a Badge!"
 "A Birdie Said You'd Be Here" (final issue)

Marvel Digests

 Marvel Age Spider-Man
 Volume 1: Fearsome Foes, reprints Marvel Age Spider-Man #1-4, April 2004, 
 Volume 2: Everyday Hero, reprints Marvel Age Spider-Man #5-8, July 2004, 
 Volume 3: Swingtime, reprints Marvel Age Spider-Man #9-12, July 2004, 
 Volume 4: The Goblin Strikes, reprints Marvel Age Spider-Man #13-16, November 2004, 
 Volume 5: Spidey Strikes Back, reprints Marvel Age Spider-Man #17-20, March 2005, 
 Marvel Adventures Spider-Man
 Volume 1: The Sinister Six, reprints Marvel Adventures Spider-Man #1-4, August 2005, 
 Volume 2: Power Struggle, reprints Marvel Adventures Spider-Man #5-8, December 2005, 
 Volume 3: Doom with a View, reprints Marvel Adventures Spider-Man #9-12, June 2006, 
 Volume 4: Concrete Jungle, reprints Marvel Adventures Spider-Man #13-16, September 2006, 
 Volume 5: Monsters on the Prowl, reprints Marvel Adventures Spider-Man #17-20, February 2007, 
 Volume 6: The Black Costume, reprints Marvel Adventures Spider-Man #21-24, June 2007, 
 Volume 7: Secret Identity, reprints Marvel Adventures Spider-Man #25-28, September 2007, 
 Volume 8: Forces of Nature, reprints Marvel Adventures Spider-Man #29-32, January 2008, 
 Volume 9: Fiercest Foes, reprints Marvel Adventures Spider-Man #33-36, May 2008, 
 Volume 10: Identity Crisis, reprints Marvel Adventures Spider-Man #37-40, October 2008, 
 Volume 11: Animal Instinct, reprints Marvel Adventures Spider-Man #41-44, December 2008, 
 Volume 12: Jumping to Conclusions, reprints Marvel Adventures Spider-Man #45-48, May 2009, 
 Volume 13: Animal Attack!, reprints Marvel Adventures Spider-Man #49-52, August 2009, 
 Volume 14: Thwip!, reprints Marvel Adventures Spider-Man #53-56, December 2009, 
 Volume 15: Peter Parker vs. the X-Men, reprints Marvel Adventures Spider-Man #58-61, 2010,

External links
Marvel Adventures Spider-Man (2005 - 2010) at Marvel.com
Marvel Adventures Spider-Man (2010 - Present) at Marvel.com
Marvel Adventures Spider-Man at Spiderfan.org
Marvel Adventures Flip Magazine at Spiderfan.org

Spider-Man titles
Comics by Fred Van Lente